Abdoullah Ba (born 31 July 2003) is a French professional footballer who plays as a midfielder for EFL Championship club Sunderland.

Early life 
Abdoullah Ba was born in Saint-Aubin-lès-Elbeuf, and started playing football in the Club Andelle of Pîtres.

Club career 
Ba came through the ranks of Le Havre, where he was offered his first professional contract during the summer 2020, becoming one of the youngest players to turn pro in the Norman club, and entering Paul Le Guen's squad for the following season. He made his professional debut for Le Havre AC on the 4 May 2021, coming on as a substitute in the Ligue 2 game against Toulouse FC.

On 31 August 2022, Ba signed permanently for English EFL Championship club Sunderland, signing a five-year contract. He scored his first goal for Sunderland on 12 March 2023 in a 1-0 win against Norwich City.

International career 
Abdoullah Ba is a youth international for France, making his debut for France U17 on the 17 September 2019, in a friendly game against Netherlands. He is of Mauritanian descent.

Career statistics

References

External links

2003 births
Living people
French footballers
People from Saint-Aubin-lès-Elbeuf
France youth international footballers
French sportspeople of Mauritanian descent
Association football midfielders
Le Havre AC players
Ligue 2 players
Championnat National 3 players
Sportspeople from Seine-Maritime
Footballers from Normandy
Sunderland A.F.C. players
French expatriate sportspeople
French expatriate footballers
Expatriate footballers in England
French expatriate sportspeople in England